Travis Oleksuk (born February 3, 1989) is a Canadian professional ice hockey forward. He is currently playing with Starbulls Rosenheim in the German Oberliga. Oleksuk most recently iced with EC VSV in the Austrian IceHL. Prior to that, Oleksuk had a short spell with Sheffield Steelers of the UK's Elite Ice Hockey League (EIHL). Oleksuk also previously played for Graz99ers of the Austrian Hockey League (IceHL).

Playing career
Oleksuk attended the University of Minnesota Duluth where he played four seasons (2008-2012) of NCAA college hockey with the Minnesota–Duluth Bulldogs, scoring 45 goals and 70 assists for 155 points, and earning 75 penalty minutes, in 133 games played.

On March 30, 2012, the San Jose Sharks of the National Hockey League signed Oleksuk as an unrestricted free agent to an entry level contract, and he was assigned to play the 2012–13 season with the Worcester Sharks of the American Hockey League.

After three seasons within the Sharks organization, Oleksuk left as a free agent to sign a one-year AHL contract with the Hartford Wolf Pack, an affiliate of the New York Rangers on September 2, 2015. In the 2015–16 season with the Wolf Pack, Oleksuk appeared in 67 games recording 7 goals and 22 points in securing a regular role amongst the checking line.

As a free agent in the following off-season, Oleksuk opted to pursue a European career, agreeing to a one-year contract with Italian based HCB South Tyrol, who compete in the Austrian EBEL on July 28, 2016.

After two seasons with Bolzano and three with Graz 99ers, Oleksuk agreed terms with the Sheffield Steelers for the 2021–22 season. After just 5 games with the Steelers, Oleksuk departed Sheffield in October 2021 for personal reasons. He moved back to Austria to sign for EC VSV.

For the 2022–23 season, Oleksuk continued his career in Europe by moving to German third-tier club, Starbulls Rosenheim of the Oberliga.

Career statistics

Awards and honours

References

External links

1989 births
Living people
Bolzano HC players
Canadian expatriate ice hockey players in Italy
Canadian ice hockey centres
EC VSV players
Graz 99ers players
Hartford Wolf Pack players
Minnesota Duluth Bulldogs men's ice hockey players
Sioux City Musketeers players
Sheffield Steelers players
Starbulls Rosenheim players
Worcester Sharks players